Christopher Taylor (born 1967) is an American attorney and politician who has served as the mayor of Ann Arbor, Michigan since 2014.

He has earned four degrees from the University of Michigan, and served on the boards of directors of various Ann Arbor non-profit organizations before being elected to public office. In 2008, Taylor was elected to Ann Arbor City Council as a Democrat, on which he served a total of three terms before announcing his mayoral campaign in 2013. After winning a highly contested Democratic primary in August 2014, he was elected Mayor of Ann Arbor on November 4, 2014, winning 84.21% of the vote as he easily defeated independent candidate Bryan Kelly.

Taylor's philosophy generally resembles that of his predecessor, John Hieftje, including his emphases on development, infrastructure, and the relationship between the city and the University of Michigan.

Early life
Taylor was born in 1967 in New York City, and moved to Illinois with his family in 1976. During his junior and senior years of high school, he attended the Interlochen Arts Academy, near Traverse City, Michigan. In 1985, he enrolled at the University of Michigan, from which he has earned four degrees: a B.A. in English, a B.M.A. in Vocal Performance, an M.A. in American History, and a J.D. He was president of the Inter-Cooperative Council at the University of Michigan, a housing cooperative counting 550 members, and served as editor-in-chief of the Michigan Law Review while attending the University of Michigan Law School.

Taylor is a corporate and commercial attorney, and he practices with the law firm Hooper Hathaway in Ann Arbor. Prior to joining Hooper Hathaway, he worked with Butzel Long, also in Ann Arbor, and Ropes & Gray in Boston; he was additionally a law clerk for Bruce Selya, a judge on the United States Court of Appeals for the First Circuit. Prior to being elected to public office, Taylor served on the boards of directors of the Ann Arbor non-profit organizations 826michigan, Ann Arbor in Concert, and FestiFools.

Political career

Ann Arbor City Council 
In 2008, Taylor ran for Ann Arbor City Council as a Democrat on a platform that included restraining spending, balancing development with the city's character, investing in infrastructure, protecting the city's parks and recreation offerings, and supporting its neediest residents. In the election, he defeated fellow Democrat Stephen Kunselman by a two-to-one margin for a seat on the council. He would not be challenged in an election again until he ran for mayor in 2014. Taylor served a total of three terms on Ann Arbor City Council, where he represented the city's Third Ward. In 2010, he announced that he would seek re-election due in part to the effects of the Great Recession on the city.

During his tenure, Taylor participated in the City Council's Budget Committee, City Administrator Search Committee, Council Rules Committee, Parks Advisory Commission, Senior Center and Mack Pool Task Force, and Taxicab Board. As a Council member, Taylor gained a reputation for supporting Ann Arbor's local crosswalk law, advocating for more commercial and residential recycling, maintaining zoning boundaries and downtown building height limits, opposing digital billboards, and subsidizing public art; in December 2013, he co-sponsored a proposal to contribute $10,000 to help fund the 2014 Ann Arbor Street Art Fair.

Mayoral campaign 
Taylor officially announced his campaign for mayor on December 20, 2013, when he submitted the 250 signatures (50 each from Ann Arbor's five wards) required to run for the office. At the time, MLive reporter Ryan Stanton described him as one of then-mayor John Hieftje's "closest political allies"; for his part, Hieftje called Taylor "incredibly competent and highly qualified" and opined that he would "make a fine mayor". In August 2014, Taylor took 47.57% of the vote and the party nomination in the Democratic primary, edging fellow Council members Stephen Kunselman, Sabra Briere, and Sally Hart Petersen in a highly contested race. During his campaign, Taylor spent more money than any of his competitors: a total of $75,698.

Mayor of Ann Arbor 
On November 4, 2014, Taylor was elected Mayor of Ann Arbor, winning 84.21% of the vote as he easily defeated independent candidate Bryan Kelly. Andrew Cluley of WEMU described the result as one that would not bring any major changes to Ann Arbor's municipal government, opining that while "a few names may be changing...most of the policies are expected to remain the same". Taylor was sworn in on November 10, 2014, at the city clerk's office. In a December 2014 interview, he outlined some of the most pressing issues facing the city and his administration: among them, the need for greater residential density downtown, making the city more affordable for the working class, better supporting the arts, and determining the future direction and development of Liberty Plaza, a downtown park.

Ann Arbor Observer writer James Leonard described the similarities between Taylor and his predecessor, Hieftje, as "striking"; Michigan Daily reporter Emma Kerr noted that Taylor's philosophy echoed Hieftje's on several key issues, including development, infrastructure, and the relationship between the city and the University of Michigan. More specifically, Taylor expressed his intentions to individually evaluate construction projects and amend then-current zoning regulations, maintain and repair local roads (although he acknowledged that much of this work was being done at the county level), and meet with University president Mark Schlissel. Both Taylor and Hieftje consider transportation to be among the most important and impactful of the city government's responsibilities, including its local bus service and a proposal for commuter rail.

Leonard also noted what he perceived to be key differences between the two mayors, describing Hieftje as "at heart a salesman who truly loves his product" and Taylor as "at heart an attorney who persuades through reasoned discussion"; he added that Taylor's "cooler approach could accomplish as much while alienating fewer people".

Personal life
Taylor is married to Ann Arbor native Eva Rosenwald, and the couple have two children. Outside of his political and professional careers, Taylor has also performed with a large number of community theaters and local choirs.

Electoral history

City Council

2008

2010

2012

Mayor

2014

2018

References

External links

Mayor of Ann Arbor
 

1967 births
21st-century American politicians
Mayors of Ann Arbor, Michigan
Michigan city council members
Michigan Democrats
Living people
Politicians from New York City
University of Michigan College of Literature, Science, and the Arts alumni
University of Michigan Law School alumni
University of Michigan School of Music, Theatre & Dance alumni